0-0 or O-O may refer to:
 Emoticon for a person who wears glasses
 An informal instruction to watch the conductor of an orchestra, seen in orchestral parts
 Kingside castling in chess notation
Nothing from Nothing (disambiguation), songs
Object Oriented Programming, a style of modern computer programming
 A surrogate for ∞, the infinity symbol

See also 
 00 (disambiguation)
 Zero Zero (disambiguation)